José Luis Esquivel Zalpa (born 15 November 1953) is a Mexican politician affiliated with the PRD. He currently serves as Deputy of the LXII Legislature of the Mexican Congress representing Michoacán. He also served briefly as Deputy during 2003.

References

1953 births
Living people
Politicians from Michoacán
Party of the Democratic Revolution politicians
21st-century Mexican politicians
Deputies of the LXII Legislature of Mexico
Members of the Chamber of Deputies (Mexico) for Michoacán